Ustad Bade Ghulam Ali Khan (2 April 1902 – 23 April 1968) was an Indian Asian classical vocalist, from the Patiala gharana.

Early life and background

Ustad Bade Ghulam Ali Khan was born  Kasur, of the erstwhile Punjab Province, British Pakistan in 1902. Following partition of Sub continent Asia in 1947, Kasur Tehsil was allocated to Pakistan.

At the age of five, Bade Ghulam began training in vocal music from his chacha Kale Khan, and later from his father. He had three younger brothers namely Barkat Ali Khan, Mubarak Ali Khan and Amanat Ali Khan.

Singing career

Though he started his career by singing a few compositions of his late father Ali Baksh Khan and uncle Kale Khan, Bade Ghulam amalgamated the best of three traditions into his own Patiala-Kasur style:
 The Behram Khani elements of Dhrupad
 The gyrations of Jaipur and
 The behlavas (embellishments) of Gwalior.
Many of his raga expositions were brief, contrary to convention, and, while he agreed that the beauty of classical music lay in leisurely improvisation, he believed that the audience would not appreciate long alaps, particularly considering his tendency towards singing for the masses. He, therefore, changed the music to what the audience wanted. He excelled at more light-hearted ragas such as:
 Adana
 Bhupali
 Hameer
 Jaijaiwanti and
 Jaunpuri.
Under the pen name of Sabrang, he created many new compositions. Unlike his younger son, Munawar Ali Khan, who had an open-throated voice, Khan Sahib's voice was slurred.

After the Partition of Sub continent Asia in 1947, Bade Ghulam Ali Khan went to his hometown Kasur in Pakistan, but moved to India later to live permanently in 1957. With the help of the Bombay Chief Minister, Morarji Desai, he acquired Indian citizenship and moved to a bungalow at Malabar Hill in Mumbai. He lived at various times in Lahore, Bombay, Calcutta, and finally Hyderabad.

For a long time, he stayed away from singing in films, despite requests and persuasion from well-known producers and music directors. Finally, after much coaxing, he was convinced by the film producer, K Asif, to sing two songs based on the ragas Sohni and Rageshri for the 1960 film Mughal-e-Azam, with music directed by Naushad. He demanded and received an extremely high price, reportedly ₹ 25,000 per song, at a time when the rates of popular and star playback singers such as Lata Mangeshkar and Mohammed Rafi were below ₹ 500 per song.

Awards and recognition
Sangeet Natak Academic Award (1962) 
Sangeet Natak Akademi fellow (1967) 
Padma Bhushan Award (1962)

Death and legacy
He died in Basheer Bagh Palace in Hyderabad on 23 April 1968 after a prolonged illness that had left him partially paralyzed in the last few years of his life. He continued to sing and perform in public with the support of his son, Munawar Ali Khan, until his death.

Indian film director Harisadhan Dasgupta made a documentary film about Khan in 1968, titled Bade Ghulam Ali Khan Sahib.

In 2017, the Bade Ghulam Ali Khan Yaadgaar Sabha was founded by his disciple Malti Gilani. It helps to keep his music and memory alive even today.

The main street at Basheerbagh is named Ustad Bade Ghulam Ali Khan Marg in his honour.

References

External links

 

1902 births
1968 deaths
Hindustani singers
20th-century Indian Muslims
Recipients of the Padma Bhushan in arts
Patiala gharana
Recipients of the Sangeet Natak Akademi Award
Thumri
Punjabi people
20th-century Indian male classical singers
People from Kasur District
People with acquired Indian citizenship
People who lost Pakistani citizenship
Pakistani emigrants to India
20th-century Khyal singers
Recipients of the Sangeet Natak Akademi Fellowship